Joseph Early Widener (August 19, 1871 – October 26, 1943) was a wealthy American art collector who was a founding benefactor of the National Gallery of Art in Washington, D.C. A major figure in thoroughbred horse racing, he was head of New York's Belmont Park and builder of Miami's Hialeah Park racetrack in Florida.

Early life
Widener was born in Philadelphia, the third and only surviving son of the extremely wealthy transportation and real estate magnate Peter A. B. Widener (1834–1915) and Hannah Josephine Dunton (1836–1896). His older brother George Dunton Widener died on the RMS Titanic. Widener attended Harvard College, and for a short time studied architecture at the University of Pennsylvania.

Thoroughbred horse racing
Widener used his great wealth to pursue his interest in Thoroughbred horse racing on a large scale. Not only did he become an owner of a large stable of racehorses, Widener acquired the Elmendorf Farm in Lexington, Kentucky and the Belmont Park racetrack in New York, plus he built Hialeah Park racetrack in Miami, Florida.

In 1901, Widener began purchasing Thoroughbred horses to compete in both flat racing and steeplechase events. He hired future U.S. Racing Hall of Fame horse trainer J. Howard Lewis. For the next four decades, they combined to race fourteen champions, two in flat racing and twelve in steeplechase. Widener's steeplechase horses won numerous important races including three editions of the American Grand National with Relluf (1914), Arc Light (1929), and Bushranger (1936). His steeplechasers Bushranger and Fairmount were both elected to the U.S. Racing Hall of Fame.

Following the death of August Belmont Jr., Widener and friends W. Averell Harriman and George Herbert Walker purchased much of Belmont's Thoroughbred breeding stock. For his Elmendorf Farm breeding operation, Widener acquired Belmont's very important sire Fair Play and the broodmare Mahubah, the parents of Man o' War. He also purchased a son of Fair Play named Chance Shot who would go on to win the 1927 Belmont Stakes and following the 1929 death of Fair Play would become Elmendorf Farm's leading sire. Widener had a life-size statue of Fair Play erected by his grave at Elmendorf Farm.

As part of the selloff of the August Belmont Jr. estate, in 1925 Widener also acquired majority control of Belmont Park in Elmont, New York and would serve as the race track's president until 1939 when failing health necessitated his stepping down.

In 1930, he imported the stallion Sickle from Lord Derby in England who came to visit the U.S. that year and was Widener's guest at the 1930 Kentucky Derby. A son of the very important sire Phalaris, Sickle would produce 45 Graded stakes race winners and be the leading sire in North America in 1936 and 1938.

Following Chance Shot's win in the 1927 Belmont Stakes, Widener's racing stable won the race two more times with Hurryoff in 1933 and with a son of Chance Shot in 1934 named Peace Chance. He also had five horses compete in the Kentucky Derby with his best finishes a second place earned by Osmand in 1927 and by Brevity in 1936.

Widener's father had had business interests in France and like other wealthy elite Americans of that era, maintained a place in fashionable Paris. In addition to racing horses in the United States, Widener also kept a stable of Thoroughbreds in France. Competing in French grass racing, his horses won the 1923 and 1926 editions of the Prix La Rochette and the 1923, 1924, and 1937 runnings of the Prix d'Aumale.

Widener also owned English Hackney horses who competed at various shows.

Personal life
On March 27, 1894 Widener married Eleanor ″Ella″ Holmes Pancoast (1874–1929) with whom he had two children:
Peter Arrell Browne Widener II (1895–1948)
Josephine "Fifi" Widener Leidy Holden Wichfeld Bigelow (1902–1961)
Joan Widener Leidy (1923–1988) was married from 1941 to 1950 to State Senator George Eustis Paine (1920–1991)

Widener raised his family at Lynnewood Hall, his father's 110-room Georgian-style mansion  in Elkins Park, Pennsylvania. Designed by Horace Trumbauer and Jacques Greber, the mansion, along with its extensive and important art collection, was part of the huge fortune he inherited.

In poor health for several years, Widener died at his Lynnewood Hall estate in 1943 and was interred in the Widener family mausoleum, Section K, Lot 338 at Laurel Hill Cemetery in Philadelphia.

Hialeah Park
In 1930, Widener built a  mansion in Palm Beach, Florida. where he would spend a good part of most winters. That same year, he purchased a controlling interest in the Miami Jockey Club and in 1931 renovated Hialeah Park. Hailed as one of the most beautiful Thoroughbred race tracks in the world, in 1979 Hialeah Park was listed on the United States National Register of Historic Places. Major races here were the Widener Handicap inaugurated in 1936, and the Flamingo Stakes, an important stepping stone to the Kentucky Derby for 3-year-old horses. Following Widener's death, ownership of the facility changed hands several times and after running into financial difficulties it closed in 2001.

Art collection
Widener added to the extensive and valuable art collection he had inherited from his father. His collection included a dozen or more works by Rembrandt as well as those by Johannes Vermeer, Édouard Manet, Pierre-Auguste Renoir and others. In 1939, Widener made a number of donations from his assorted collections including manuscripts of historical and artistic importance given to the Rare Book Department at the Free Library of Philadelphia. However, his most important philanthropic endeavor was as a founding benefactor of the National Gallery of Art in Washington, D.C. Widener's 1939 donation of a vast collection was announced by U. S. President Franklin D. Roosevelt at the Gallery's opening ceremony. Known as the Widener Collection, the more than 2,000 sculptures, paintings, decorative art, and porcelains went on display in 1942. Widener's own 1921 portrait by Augustus John hangs in the National Gallery of Art.

References

Sources
Joseph Widener, Paintings at Lynnewood Hall (Elkins Park, PA: privately printed, 1923).
Peter A. B. Widener II, Without Drums (New York: G.P. Putnam's Sons, 1940).

External links
 Normandy Farm, Lexington, Kentucky at the National Sporting Library's Thoroughbred Heritage website
 Joseph E. Widener, Founding Benefactor of the National Gallery of Art, Washington, D.C.
 (Joseph E.) Widener Collection at the National Gallery of Art, Washington, D.C.
 Lewis-Widener manuscript collection at the Free Library of Philadelphia
 Joseph E. Widener's biography of at the National Gallery of Art, Washington, D.C.

American art collectors
American racehorse owners and breeders
French racehorse owners and breeders
American horse racing industry executives
American philanthropists
Businesspeople from Philadelphia
Harvard University alumni
University of Pennsylvania School of Design alumni
1871 births
1943 deaths
Widener family
Burials at Laurel Hill Cemetery (Philadelphia)
People from Cheltenham, Pennsylvania